Sir Bijoy Prasad Singh Roy, KCIE (1894, Calcutta  24 November 1961, Calcutta) was an Indian politician.

Biography 
Singh Roy studied at the Hindu School and the Presidency University, Kolkata, and received a Bachelor and Master of Laws from the Law College Kolkata.  Later he was a lawyer at the Calcutta High Court.

In 1921 Roy was elected to the Bengal Legislative Council in British India and was Minister of Local Self-Government in 1930. On 1 April 1932, he introduced a bill on a municipal code. Singh Roy was Sheriff of Calcutta and from 1937 to 1941 in the cabinet of AK Fazlul Huq with responsibility for the Treasury in Bengal.  From 1943 to 1947 he was chairman of the Bengal Legislative Assembly.He was knighted in 1933 and created KCIE in 1943.

In 1947 Roy was the President of the Calcutta Club. After the first India-Pakistan war, on 6 July 1950 he gave a speech on All India Radio covering an Indo-Pakistani agreement.

From 1958 to 1959, Singh Roy was Chairman of the Federation of Indian Chambers of Commerce and Industry (FICCI).

References

1894 births
1961 deaths
Bengali politicians
Indian knights
Knights Commander of the Order of the Indian Empire